Mainstream is a CD released by the Fullerton College Jazz Band in 1994, it was critically acclaimed by Down Beat Magazine being given three and a half stars.

Background 
In 1981 the Music Department at Fullerton College built a 16 track in house recording facility which was to serve as a teaching tool for both student music groups and students wanting to take recording technology classes at a vocational level.  By 1994, when the CD Mainstream was produced, there has been several award winning recordings such as Time Tripping coming from the Fullerton College Jazz Band.    The group has been the recipient of numerous Down Beat and NARAS awards and the CDs are distributed worldwide.

During this time the group was selected as the winner for the first ten-day Disney World/International Association for Jazz Education competition for College and University bands; the Fullerton College Jazz Band #1 performed at Disney World in Orlando during the inaugural concerts.  After a two-week tour for the U.S. State Department, they opened the 1995 Munich International Jazz Festival.

The CD was dedicated to Rich Matteson who was a highly noted educator and musical artist; he had passed in 1993 shortly after his performances on the recording. A video recording was also made of Matteson's appearance on the CD.  Two of the tracks are arranged by Fullerton College Jazz Band alum Jack Cooper.

Track listing

Recording Sessions 
 recorded 1990-1993 live and in studio, Fullerton College, Fullerton, California

Personnel

Musicians 
Conductors: James Linahon
Euphonium (guest soloist): Rich Matteson
Trumpet (guest soloists): Don Rader and James Linahon
Saxes and woodwinds: Scheila Gonzalez, Andy Ehling, Dan Boulton, Padraic McCoy, Morgan Fry, Steve Slate, David Shoop, Steve Slate, Alicia Mangan 
Trumpets and flugelhorns: John Trombetta, Al Abrahms, Jennifer Nelson, Dave Allen, Richard Morgan, Matt Estrada, Ed Medina, Greg Back, David Brown, Jennifer Belk  
Trombones: Ryan Anglin, Tony Arcaro, Matt Batezel, Jeff Stupin, Ray Rust, Jeremy Lynch, Jason McKnight, Francisco Torres, Larry Ebstein
Guitar: Mike Scott 
Piano: Mark Lewis, John Erickson
Bass: Trini Sanchez, Garret Graves, April Hayes 
Drums: Shawn Nourse, Isaac Sanchez, Jared Spears

Production 
Recording engineers: Trent Nelson and Scott Francisco
Second Audio engineer: Jay Hamacek
Mixing engineer: James Linahon
Mastering: Robert Vosgien at CMS Digital 
Liner notes: James Linahon 
Album design: Susan Baxter

Reception 
Good/Very Good - "... Most of the pieces are classic American songbook material played with the command of a good studio band ..."

Down Beat Magazine

References

External links

 

 Official website

1994 albums
Fullerton College Jazz Band albums